On June 5, 1942, the United States declared war on Bulgaria. Bulgaria was neutral during 1939–1941, but on March 1, 1941, Bulgaria signed the Tripartite Pact and officially joined the Axis bloc. Following this, the Bulgarian government declared war on the United Kingdom and the United States on December 13, 1941. On June 4, 1942 the United States Congress passed joint resolutions declaring war on Bulgaria along with Hungary and Romania.  President Roosevelt approved all three declarations the following day.  The capital of Bulgaria, Sofia, and other Bulgarian cities, were bombed by Allied aircraft in 1943 and 1944.

, the declarations of war against Bulgaria, Hungary, and Romania are the last formal declarations of war by the United States Congress, which in the era of collective security has largely ceded the war power to the President.

Text of the declaration 
JOINT RESOLUTION Declaring that a state of war exists between the Government of Bulgaria and the Government and the people of the United States and making provisions to prosecute the same.

Whereas the Government of Bulgaria has formally declared war against the Government and the people of the United States of America: Therefore, be it

Resolved by the Senate and House of Representatives of the United States of America in Congress assembled, That the state of war between the United States and the Government of Bulgaria which has thus been thrust upon the United States is hereby formally declared; and the President is hereby authorized and directed to employ the entire naval and military forces of the United States and the resources of the Government to carry on war against the Government of Bulgaria; and, to bring the conflict to a successful termination, all the resources of the country are hereby pledged by the Congress of the United States.

See also
Military history of Bulgaria during World War II
Bombing of Sofia in World War II

References

External links
Declaration of War with Bulgaria, WWII (H.R.Res. 319). United States Senate Archive.
The Secretary of State to All American Missions regarding declaration of war against Hungary, Romania, and Bulgaria. Office of the Historian, United States State Department. From Foreign Relations Of The United States: Diplomatic Papers, 1942, Europe, Volume II.
 The Armistice Agreement with Bulgaria; October 28, 1944 at Historical Resources about the Second World War
The Peace Treaty with Bulgaria, signed in Paris in 1947  at The Avalon Project - Documents in History, Law and Diplomacy (Yale Law School)

1942 in Bulgaria
1942 in the United States
1942 in international relations
Bulgaria
Declarations of war during World War II
June 1942 events
1942 documents
Bulgaria–United States military relations